The Annales de l'Institut Fourier is a French mathematical journal publishing papers in all fields of mathematics. It was established in 1949. The journal publishes one volume per year, consisting of six issues. The current editor-in-chief is Hervé Pajot. Articles are published either in English or in French.

The journal is indexed in Mathematical Reviews, Zentralblatt MATH and the Web of Science. According  to the Journal Citation Reports, the journal had a 2008 impact factor of 0.804.

References

External links
 

Mathematics journals
Publications established in 1949
Multilingual journals
Bimonthly journals
Open access journals
1949 establishments in France